The New Zealand electoral system has been mixed-member proportional (MMP) since the 1996 election. MMP was introduced following a referendum in 1993. It replaced the first-past-the-post (FPP) system New Zealand had previously used for most of its history. New Zealanders elect their members of parliament (MPs) with two votes. The first vote is for a candidate from an electorate (electoral district). The second vote is used to elect ranked party lists.

New Zealand has a single-house legislature, the House of Representatives, usually with 120 members, although the number can increase because of (generally) one or two overhang seats, depending on the outcome of the electoral process. The 53rd Parliament, elected in 2020, has 120 seats: 72 were filled by electorate MPs, with the remaining 48 filled by list MPs according to each party's share of the party vote. New elections are held for the New Zealand Parliament at least every three years. 

In 1893, New Zealand was the first country in the world to grant women the right to vote. This meant that, theoretically, New Zealand had universal suffrage from 1893, meaning all adults 21 years of age and older were allowed to vote (in 1969 the voting age was lowered from 21 to 20. It was lowered again to 18 in 1974). However, the voting rules that applied to the European settlers did not apply to Māori, and their situation is still unique in that a number of seats in the New Zealand Parliament are elected by Māori voters alone.

In contemporary New Zealand, generally all permanent residents and citizens aged 18 or older are eligible to vote. The main exceptions include citizens who have lived overseas continuously for too long, and convicted persons who are detained in a psychiatric hospital or serving a prison term of more than three years.

Term of parliament 

Although parliamentary elections are held at least every three years, this has not always been the case. In New Zealand's early colonial history, the parliamentary term could last up to five years – as established by the New Zealand Constitution Act 1852. The term was reduced to three years in 1879 because of concerns about the growing power of central government.

Since then, the term has been altered three times – mainly in times of international crisis. During the First World War it was extended to five years. In the early 1930s, it was pushed out to four years. This proved to be unpopular with the electorate and after the election of 1935, the term was reduced to three years again. It was extended to four years once again during the Second World War, but returned to three years afterwards. In 1956, the term of three years was 'entrenched' in the Electoral Act which means that it can only be changed by achieving a majority in a national referendum or by a vote of 75% of all members of Parliament.

In 2013 the Government established an advisory panel to conduct a review of constitutional issues – including an examination of the term of parliament. Other issues discussed at public meetings held by the panel were the number of MPs New Zealand should have, whether a written constitution is needed, and whether all legislation should be consistent with the Bill of Rights Act. Both Prime Minister John Key and Opposition leader David Shearer expressed support for an extension of the parliamentary term to four years. The main argument put forward in support of a longer term is that "Governments need time to establish and then implement new policies".

The last referendum on the term of parliament was in 1990 and found nearly 70% of the voters were opposed to extending the term. An opinion poll on the news website Stuff in early 2013 found that of 3,882 respondents, 61% were in favour of changing to a four-year term.

Māori seats 

A unique feature of New Zealand's electoral system is that a number of seats in Parliament are reserved exclusively for Māori. However, this was not always the case. In the early colonial era, Māori could not vote in elections unless they owned land as individuals. European colonists were quite happy with this state of affairs because, according to NZ History online, "they did not think Māori were yet 'civilised' enough to exercise such an important responsibility". At the time, Māori were dealing directly with the Crown in regard to the Treaty of Waitangi and had little interest in the 'pākehā parliament'.

During the wars of the 1860s, some settlers began to realise it was necessary to bring Māori into the British system if the two sides were to get along. After much debate, in 1867 Parliament passed the Maori Representation Act, which established four electorates solely for Māori. The four Māori seats were a very minor concession; the settlers had 72 seats at the time and, on a per capita basis, Māori should have got up to 16 seats. All Māori men (but not women) over the age of 21 were given the right to vote and to stand for Parliament.

Full-blooded Māori had to vote in the Māori seats and only Māori with mixed parentage ('half-castes') were allowed to choose whether they voted in European electorates or Māori electorates. This dual voting system continued until 1975. From time to time there was public discussion about whether New Zealand still needed separate seats for Māori – which some considered to be a form of apartheid. Māori were only allowed to stand for election in European seats (or general electorates) from 1967.

In 1985, a Royal Commission on the Electoral System was established. It concluded that "separate seats had not helped Maori and that they would achieve better representation through a proportional party-list system". The Commission recommended that if mixed-member proportional (MMP) system was adopted, the Māori seats should be abolished. However, most Māori wanted to keep them and the seats were not only retained under MMP, their "number would now increase or decrease according to the results (population numbers) of the regular Māori electoral option". As a result, in 1996 before the first MMP election, the number of Māori seats increased to five – the first increase in 129 years. In 2002, it went up to seven.

Developments in voting rights and eligibility

Secret ballot 
In European seats, the secret ballot was introduced in 1870. However, Māori continued to use a verbal system – whereby electors had to tell the polling official which candidate they wanted to vote for. Māori were not allowed a secret ballot until 1938 and even voted on a different day. According to NZ History online: "Up until 1951 Maori voted on a different day from Europeans, often several weeks later." It was not until 1951 that voting in the four Māori electorates was held on the same day as voting in the general election.

NZ History also states: "There were also no electoral rolls for the Maori seats. Electoral officials had always argued that it would be too difficult to register Maori voters (supposedly because of difficulties with language, literacy and proof of identity). Despite frequent allegations of electoral irregularities in the Maori seats, rolls were not used until the 1949 election."

Today, voters cast their secret ballot at polling places or via postal vote.

Māori representation 
Māori representation by four Māori members was introduced in 1868, see First Māori elections. Most Māori land was held collectively, so most Māori did not meet the property qualification for voting.

Male suffrage  
Universal male suffrage was introduced in the 1881 New Zealand general election, following a law change in 1879. Previously there had been a property qualification for voting, and this was often listed in earlier electoral rolls.

Special electorates for gold miners in the South Island for which the only qualification was holding a mining licence, the Gold Fields electorate and the Gold Field Towns electorate took part in the  1866. They existed between 1862 and 1870.

Women's suffrage 

In early colonial New Zealand, as in most Western countries, women were totally excluded from political affairs. Led by Kate Sheppard, a women's suffrage movement began in New Zealand in the late 19th century, and the legislative council finally passed a bill allowing women to vote in 1893. This made New Zealand the first country in the world to give women the vote. However, they were not allowed to stand as candidates until 1919, and the first female Member of Parliament (Elizabeth McCombs) was not elected until 1933 – 40 years later. Although there have been three female Prime Ministers (Jenny Shipley, Helen Clark and Jacinda Ardern), women remain somewhat under-represented in Parliament. Following the election in 2011, 39 MPs (almost one third) were women. After the 2011 election, on a global ranking New Zealand is 21st in terms of its representation of women in Parliament.

Prisoners' right to vote 

The voting rights of prisoners in New Zealand have been in a near constant state of flux since the earliest elections – currently prisoners serving terms longer than three years cannot vote.

In 2010, the National government passed the Electoral (Disqualification of Convicted Prisoners) Amendment Bill which removed the right of all sentenced prisoners to vote (regardless of the length of sentence imposed). The Attorney-General stated that the new law was inconsistent with the Bill of Rights Act, which says that "every New Zealand citizen who is over the age of 18 years has the right to vote and stand in genuine periodic elections of members of the House of Representatives". The Electoral Disqualification Bill was also opposed by the Law Society and the Human Rights Commission who pointed out that, in addition to being inconsistent with the Bill of Rights, the legislation was also incompatible with various international treaties that New Zealand is party to.

Law Society Human Rights committee member, Jonathan Temm, in a written submission, told Parliament's law and order committee that: "It is critical for the function of our democracy that we do not interfere with the right to vote." With specific reference to decisions made by courts in Canada, Australia and South Africa, and by the European Court of Human Rights in respect of the United Kingdom, she pointed out that "every comparable overseas jurisdiction has had a blanket ban (against prisoners' voting) struck down in the last 10 years".

In 2020, the Electoral Act was amended so that only persons serving a sentence of imprisonment for a term of three years or more are disenfranchised – this restores the law to the position prior to 2010.

Election day
This convention was upset by Robert Muldoon calling a snap election, which was held on Saturday 14 July . The next year an election could have been held on the last Saturday of November would have been 1996, except the day for that election was brought forward slightly to avoid the need for a by-election after Hawkes' Bay MP Michael Laws resigned in April that year (by-elections are not required if a general election is to take place within six months of the vacancy).

The exceptions were in 2011, which was held in November to avoid clashing with fixtures of the New Zealand-hosted Rugby World Cup, and in 2020, which was delayed from the second-last Saturday of September due to the COVID-19 pandemic.

Prior to 1951, elections in Māori electorates were held on different days than elections in general electorates. The table below shows election dates starting with the first election that was held on a Saturday in 1938:

Key

Advance voting is also available in the two weeks before election day; voters can visit polling places during this period. In the 2020 election, 57% of voters cast an advanced vote.

MMP in New Zealand 

Until 1994, New Zealand used the first-past-the-post (FPP) electoral system, whereby the candidate who received the
most votes in each single-member constituency was elected from that constituency. This system favoured the two-party dominance of the National Party and the Labour Party. Smaller parties found it hard to gain representation; for example, despite gaining 16% of the vote in 1978 and 21% in 1981, the New Zealand Social Credit Party won only one and two seats, respectively.

Spurred by public disillusionment in the political system, Labour campaigned in 1981 and 1984 on a promise to establish a Royal Commission into the electoral system. Following their election into government in 1984, Labour established the Royal Commission into the Electoral System, and the commission's 1986 report recommended the adoption of mixed-member proportional representation (MMP). After the government sidelining the issue for years, the Bolger National government responded to public pressure by holding an indicative referendum on the electoral system in 1992. After an overwhelming majority for change, a second, binding referendum was held in 1993 asking voters to choose between FPP and MMP.

In 1994, New Zealand officially adopted MMP as its electoral system. Its defining characteristic is a mix of members of Parliament (MPs) from single-seat electorates and MPs elected from a party list, with each party's share of seats determined by its share of the party vote nationwide. The first MMP election was held in 1996. As a result, National and Labour usually lost their complete dominance in the House. Neither party would again have a majority of seats until the  saw Labour winning 65 seats, giving a majority of 4 (61 seats to hold a majority). Previously in the 2014 election the Nationals won 60 seats, 1 short of a majority.

Under MMP, New Zealand voters have two votes. The first vote is the electorate vote. It determines the local representative for that electorate (geographic electoral district). The electorate vote works on a plurality system whereby whichever candidate gets the greatest number of votes in each electorate wins the seat. The second vote is the party vote. This determines the number of seats each party is entitled to overall – in other words, the proportionality of the House.

There are two thresholds in the New Zealand MMP system:
 Any party which receives 5% or more of the party vote (the electoral threshold) is entitled to a share of the nominally 120 seats in the House of Representatives even if the party does not win an electorate seat. For instance, in the 2008 election, the Green Party failed to win any electorate seats, but won 6.7% of the party vote and so earned nine seats in Parliament.
Any party that wins one or more electorate seats is entitled to an additional share of the nominally 120 seats in House of Representatives, based on the percentage of the party vote, even if it does not win at least 5% of the party vote. In 2008, the ACT Party won only 3.6% of the party vote, but ACT got a total of five seats in the House because an ACT candidate won the Epsom electorate; this has been called the "coat-tailing" rule.

Seats in parliament are allocated to electorate MPs first, and then parties fulfil their remaining quota (based on their share of the party vote) from their list members. A closed list is used, and list seats are allocated by the Sainte-Laguë method, which favours minor parties more than the alternative D'Hondt method. If a party has more seats than it is entitled to based on the proportional party vote, then it receives overhang seats. This first occurred following the 2005 general election, when the Māori Party won 4 electorates, despite its overall party vote (2.1%) only entitling it to 3 seats; thus, it received one overhang seat and the 48th Parliament subsequently consisted of 121 MPs. The 2008 and 2011 elections also saw the Māori Party receive overhang seats (2 and 1 respectively), whilst the 2014 election saw United Future receive their one and only seat in the House as a result of an overhang.

Only parties registered with the Electoral Commission can submit party lists; unregistered parties can contest elections but cannot provide party lists. Not all registered parties submit a party list. Reasons for this may vary and include missing the deadline. The following registered parties did not submit party lists:

The 2014 case of the Internet Party and the Mana Movement not submitting lists was due to their forming an electoral alliance called Internet MANA. This alliance had to be registered as a separate party, but the individual component parties were not deregistered, and are thus listed as not having submitted a list. Internet Mana was deregistered in December 2014.

Strategic voting 
Strategic voting refers to the incidence where voters split their voting between their party vote and their candidate vote.

Partly to facilitate this, the two largest parties National and Labour usually "top up" their electoral candidates with list candidates, so that supporting a candidate of a minor party allied with their party will not reduce the number of seats that the major party wins, but supporting the minor party will increase the number of MPs who support their party in coalition. This is called "strategic voting" or sometimes "tactical voting".

Strategic voting under MMP took place during the 1996 New Zealand general election when Richard Prebble contested the Wellington Central (New Zealand electorate) for ACT New Zealand. Shortly before Election Day, National Party Leader and Prime Minister Jim Bolger indicated to National Party voters that they should vote for Prebble rather than the National candidate Mark Thomas. This was to assist ACT in winning the electorate, and thereby being available to support a new National-led government. It seemed ACT's chances of entering parliament may have depended on this; Prebble won the seat, but ACT also ended up crossing the five percent threshold.

In 1999, when Jeanette Fitzsimons contested the (usually National) seat of Coromandel for the Greens, it seemed that the Greens' chances of entering parliament were dependent on Fitzsimons' performance in Coromandel; in order to receive proportional representation, the party needed to either gain five percent of the national vote or win an electorate seat, and it appeared that the former option was unlikely. Labour Leader (and Prime Minister after the election) Helen Clark openly encouraged Labour supporters to give their constituency vote to Fitzsimons and their party vote to Labour. When normal votes had been counted, it appeared that Fitzsimons had been defeated in Coromandel by National's Murray McLean, but when special votes were tallied, Fitzsimons had a narrow lead. This guaranteed the Green Party seats in parliament regardless of whether it crossed the five percent threshold (as it eventually did).

In several recent elections in New Zealand, the National Party has suggested that its supporters in certain electorates should vote for minor parties or candidates who can win an electorate seat and would support a National government. This culminated in the Tea tape scandal, when a meeting in the Epsom electorate in 2011 was taped. The meeting was to encourage National voters in the electorate to vote "strategically" for the ACT candidate. Labour could have suggested to its supporters in the electorate to vote "strategically" for the National candidate, as the Labour candidate could not win the seat, but a National win in the seat would deprive National of an ally. However, Labour chose not to engage in this tactic, instead calling it a "sweetheart deal".

From 2008 onwards, United Future also benefited from the strategic vote. Party leader Peter Dunne was re-elected into the Ōhariū seat in 2008, 2011, and 2014, becoming a coalition partner with National, despite receiving under 1% of the party vote. In 2017, National stood candidate Brett Hundson in the electorate, but National leader Bill English vocally advocated strategic voting, saying: "We are encouraging National supporters to give their electorate vote to ACT candidate, David Seymour, in Epsom, and United Future candidate, Peter Dunne, in Ōhariu – and their party vote to National." In 2017, the Green Party did not stand a candidate in Ōhariū, in order to strengthen Labour candidate Greg O'Connor's chance at beating Dunne. When Dunne resigned from politics just a month out from the election after low polling results, the Green Party decided to stand Tane Woodley in the electorate.

2011 referendum and Electoral Commission 2012 report 
A referendum on the voting system was held in conjunction with the 2011 general election, with 57.8% of voters voting to keep the existing Mixed Member Proportional (MMP) voting system. Under the Electoral Referendum Act 2010, the majority vote automatically triggered an independent review of the workings of the system by the Electoral Commission.

The Commission released a consultation paper in February 2012 calling for public submissions on ways to improve the MMP system, with the focus put on six areas: basis of eligibility for list seats (thresholds), by-election candidates, dual candidacy, order of candidates on party lists, overhang, and proportion of electorate seats to list seats. The Commission released its proposal paper for consultation in August 2012, before publishing its final report on 29 October 2012. In the report, the Commission recommended the following:

 Reducing the party vote threshold from 5 percent to 4 percent. If the 4 percent threshold is introduced, it should be reviewed after three general elections.
 Abolishing the one electorate seat threshold – a party must cross the party vote threshold to gain list seats.
 Abolishing the provision of overhang seats for parties not reaching the threshold – the extra electorates would be made up at the expense of list seats to retain 120 MPs
 Retaining the status quo for by-election candidacy and dual candidacy.
 Retaining the status quo with closed party lists, but increasing scrutiny in selection of list candidates to ensure parties comply with their own party rules.
 Parliament should give consideration to fixing the ratio between electorate seats and list seats at 60:40 (72:48 in a 120-seat parliament)

Parliament is responsible for implementing any changes to the system, which has been largely unchanged since it was introduced in 1994 for the 1996 election. In November 2012, a private member's bill under the name of opposition Labour Party member Iain Lees-Galloway was put forward to implement the first two recommendations, but the bill was not chosen in the member's bill ballot.

In May 2014, Judith Collins and John Key said that there was no inter-party consensus on implementing the results of the Commission, so they would not introduce any legislation.

2021 electoral law review

In October 2021, the Labour government announced an independent review of New Zealand's electoral law, including aspects of the MMP system. The scope of the review has been set in its terms of reference. It is examining:

 the overall design of the legislative framework for the electoral system
 maintaining a fit-for-purpose electoral regime for voters, parties and candidates
 previous recommendations
 the term of Parliament.

The Independent Panel leading the review was announced in May 2022. The panel will provide its recommendations by the end of 2023, following public engagement.

Electoral boundaries 
The number of electorate MPs is calculated in three steps. The less populated of New Zealand's two principal islands, the South Island, has a fixed quota of 16 seats. The number of seats for the North Island and the number of special reserved seats for Māori are then calculated in proportion to these. (The Māori electorates have their own special electoral roll; people of Māori descent may opt to enroll either on this roll or on the general roll, and the number of Māori seats is determined with reference to the number of adult Māori who opt for the Māori roll.)

The number of electorates is recalculated, and the boundaries of each redrawn so as to make them approximately equal in population within a tolerance of plus or minus 5%, after each quinquennial (five-year) census. After the 2001 census, there were 7 Māori electorates and 62 general electorates, or 69 electorates in total. There were therefore normally 51 list MPs. By a quirk of timing, the 2005 election was the first election since 1996 at which the electorates were not redrawn since the previous election. A census was held on 7 March 2006 and new electorate boundaries released on 25 September 2007, creating an additional electorate in the North Island. For the election in 2011 there were 63 general electorates, 7 Māori electorates and 50 list seats, plus one overhang seat. For the election in 2014 there were 64 general electorates, 7 Māori electorates and 49 list seats, plus one overhang seat (the population increase resulted in an additional general electorate and hence a reduction in list electorates).

Representation statistics 

The Gallagher Index is a measurement of how closely the proportions of votes cast for each party is reflected in the number of parliamentary seats gained by that party. The resultant disproportionality figure is a percentage – the lower the index, the better the match.

Political parties 
, there are 18 registered political parties in New Zealand.

See also 
 Electoral reform in New Zealand
 Elections in New Zealand
Political funding in New Zealand
 New Zealand Parliament

References

External links 
 The MMP Voting System – Mixed Member Proportional
 Sainte-Laguë allocation formula
 Virtual Election Calculator

Elections in New Zealand
Politics of New Zealand
Constitution of New Zealand
New Zealand